The 2022 Barcelona Open Banc Sabadell (also known as the Torneo Godó) was a men's tennis tournament played on outdoor clay courts at the Real Club de Tenis Barcelona in Barcelona, Spain, from 18 to 24 April 2022. It was the 69th edition of the event and part of the ATP Tour 500 series of the 2022 ATP Tour.

Champions

Singles

  Carlos Alcaraz def.  Pablo Carreño Busta, 6–3, 6–2

Doubles

  Kevin Krawietz /  Andreas Mies def.   Wesley Koolhof /  Neal Skupski, 6–7(3–7), 7–6(7–5), [10–6]

Points and prize money

Points distribution

Prize money 

*per team

Singles main-draw entrants

Seeds

1 Rankings as of April 11, 2022.

Other entrants
The following players received wildcards into the main draw:
  Félix Auger-Aliassime 
  Feliciano López 
  Jaume Munar 
  Tommy Robredo

The following players received entry from the qualifying draw:
  Nicolás Álvarez Varona 
  Hugo Dellien 
  Egor Gerasimov 
  Carlos Taberner 
  Elias Ymer 
  Bernabé Zapata Miralles

The following players received entry as lucky losers:
  Hugo Grenier
  Manuel Guinard
  Gian Marco Moroni

Withdrawals 
 Before the tournament
  Roberto Bautista Agut → replaced by  Hugo Grenier
  Alejandro Davidovich Fokina → replaced by  Manuel Guinard
  Tallon Griekspoor → replaced by  Maxime Cressy
  Hubert Hurkacz → replaced by  Lorenzo Musetti
  Rafael Nadal → replaced by  Kwon Soon-woo
  Arthur Rinderknech → replaced by  Gian Marco Moroni
  Denis Shapovalov → replaced by  Pablo Andújar
  Jannik Sinner → replaced by  Jordan Thompson
  Jan-Lennard Struff → replaced by  Sebastián Báez
  Botic van de Zandschulp → replaced by  Roberto Carballés Baena

Doubles main-draw entrants

Seeds

 Rankings are as of April 11, 2022.

Other entrants
The following pairs received wildcards into the doubles main draw:
  David Marrero /  Jaume Munar 
  Feliciano López /  Marc López

The following pair received entry from the qualifying draw:
  Ugo Humbert /  Sebastian Korda

The following pairs received entry as lucky losers:
  Sander Gillé /  Joran Vliegen
  Pedro Martínez /  Lorenzo Sonego

Withdrawals 
 Before the tournament
  Carlos Alcaraz /  Pablo Carreño Busta → replaced by  Sander Gillé /  Joran Vliegen
  Lloyd Harris /  Denis Shapovalov → replaced by  Máximo González /  Lloyd Harris
  John Peers /  Filip Polášek → replaced by  Nikoloz Basilashvili /  Alexander Bublik
  Tim Pütz /  Michael Venus → replaced by  Pedro Martínez /  Lorenzo Sonego

References

External links

(ATP) tournament profile

 
Barcelona Open Banc Sabadell
2022
2022 in Spanish tennis
April 2022 sports events in Spain